Pandan Indah is a state constituency in Selangor, Malaysia, that has been represented in the Selangor State Legislative Assembly since 2018, replacing Chempaka which was used from 2004 until 2018.

Demographics

History

Polling districts 
According to the gazette issued on 30 March 2018, the Pandan Indah constituency has a total of 18 polling districts.

Representation history

Election results

References

Selangor state constituencies